Magliano Romano is a  (municipality) in the Metropolitan City of Rome in the Italian region of Latium, located about  north of Rome.

Magliano Romano borders the following municipalities: Calcata, Campagnano di Roma, Castelnuovo di Porto, Mazzano Romano, Morlupo, Rignano Flaminio, Sacrofano.

References

Cities and towns in Lazio